Léo is a town located in the province of Sissili in Burkina Faso. It is the capital of Sissili Province, and is located about 10 kilometers from the border with Ghana. The main ethnic group are the Gurunsi.

References

Leo
Sissili Province